Solariella carvalhoi is a species of sea snail, a marine gastropod mollusk in the family Solariellidae.

Description 
The maximum recorded shell length is 7 mm.

Distribution
This species occurs in the Caribbean Sea and the Gulf of Mexico; in the Atlantic Ocean off Brazil.

Habitat 
Minimum recorded depth is 0 m. Maximum recorded depth is 66 m.

References

 Rosenberg, G., F. Moretzsohn, and E. F. García. 2009. Gastropoda (Mollusca) of the Gulf of Mexico, Pp. 579–699 in Felder, D.L. and D.K. Camp (eds.), Gulf of Mexico–Origins, Waters, and Biota. Biodiversity. Texas A&M Press, College Station, Texas
 Lopes, H. de Souza and P. de sá Cardoso. 1958. Sôbre um novo gastrópodo Brasileiro do gênero "Solariella" Wood, 1842 (Trochidae). Revista Brasileira de Biologia 18: 59–64.

External links
 
 Quinn, Jr., J. F. (1992). New species of Solariella (Gastropoda: Trochidae) from the western Atlantic Ocean. Nautilus. 106(2): 50-54.
  Cavallari R.C., Salvador R.B. & Simone L.R.L. (2016). Solariella quadricincta Quinn, 1992 and S. staminea Quinn, 1992 are synonyms of S. carvalhoi Lopes & Cardoso, 1958 from the SW Atlantic (Gastropoda: Solariellidae). Zootaxa. 4109(1): 96-100
 Cavallari D.C., Salvador R.B., Dornellas A.P.S. & Simone L.R.L. (2019). Calliostomatidae, Colloniidae, Margaritidae, and Solariellidae (Gastropoda: Trochoidea) collected by the Marion Dufresne (MD55) expedition in southeastern Brazil, with description of a new species of Calliostoma. Zootaxa. 4609(3): 401-428

carvalhoi
Gastropods described in 1958